Unguriu is a commune in the Buzău County, Muntenia, Romania, 18 km north-west of Buzău, the county capital, on the bank of the river Buzău. It is composed of two villages, Ojasca and Unguriu.

History
The first mention of Unguriu is an act of Constantine Mavrocordato from the year 1782, who transferred property of the village of Unguriu to the bishopric of Buzău. In the mid-17th century, nearby, at the Ciuciuri springs, the Unguriu monastery is built.

The village of Ojasca is first mentioned in 1715, when Luxandra Ierculeasa gives the same bishopric a patch of land there.

Between 1805 and 1821, the border between Wallachia and the Habsburg monarchy came at the Ojasca springs and therefore the Unguriu monastery was temporarily destroyed.

In 1968, the commune of Unguriu (with the villages Unguriu and Ojasca) was included within the commune of Măgura, but in the year 2004, the commune was reinstated.

Economy

Most of the people from Unguriu work in mining, oil extraction, constructions, ceramics and glass manufacturing. Many people also practice agriculture, growing fruit and animals.

A number of 21 firms are located in Unguriu, in the fields of trading, production and processing of milk, metal casting, as well as mills and other service providers.

A coal mine was open between 1882-1962, and again between 1985-1997.

Notes

References
  History of Unguriu section on the commune's website

Unguriu
Localities in Muntenia